Urzhumsky District is an administrative and municipal district (raion), one of the thirty-nine in Kirov Oblast, Russia. It is located in the south of the oblast. Its administrative center is the town of Urzhum. Population:  33,959 (2002 Census);  The population of Urzhum accounts for 37.7% of the district's total population.

References

Notes

Sources

Districts of Kirov Oblast